"Don't Sit Down 'Cause I've Moved Your Chair" is a song by the English rock band Arctic Monkeys, from their 2011 album Suck It and See.

Release
The song was released as the first single from their fourth studio album Suck It and See and was released as a digital download on 12 April 2011. On 16 April, a "limited-edition white-label seven-inch vinyl version" was released followed by the formal release "on standard seven – and 10-inch vinyl single formats" on 30 May. The song was first played on Zane Lowe's BBC Radio 1 show on 11 April. The music video for the single premiered on 14 April 2011 on YouTube.

"The Blond-O-Sonic Shimmer Trap" also appears as the Japanese bonus track on Suck It and See.

In an interview, Alex Turner said "I.D.S.T" stands for "If Destroyed Still True" and is considered the second part of "Brick by Brick".

"Don't Sit Down 'Cause I've Moved Your Chair" charted at number 28 in the UK Singles Chart on downloads alone, for the week of 23 April. It spent one week in the top 40, dropping to number 43 the following week. It spent six weeks within the top 100 before a vinyl release propelled it to number 42. The single dropped out of the chart four weeks later. It has spent 12 total weeks within the top 100, their longest run since 2007's "Fluorescent Adolescent", and more than their previous lead single, "Crying Lightning". It is also their second highest charting single in Denmark and Netherlands peaking at number six and number 55 respectively.

In the UK, it sold 81,000 copies in 2011.

The music video shows the band performing the song through a 1980s-style video camera with huge amounts of colour, distortion and an old computer showing the word "DON'T". The video then pans out to see Alex Turner sat on the now infamous chair at the centre of the Kenny/Shiells altercation. Other scenes shown by the distorted colour are the band driving a Cadillac in Los Angeles during recording, Alex showing the V sign, Jamie Cook holding a Scythe on the rocks, the band in a black Daimler DS420 and clips of Sheffield Wednesday vs. Manchester United and Arsenal, citing the band's support of Wednesday.

Track listing

Personnel
Alex Turner – lead vocals, lead and rhythm guitar
Jamie Cook – lead and rhythm guitar
Nick O'Malley – bass guitar, backing vocals
Matt Helders – drums, backing vocals, lead vocals

Charts

Certifications

References

2011 singles
2011 songs
Arctic Monkeys songs
Domino Recording Company singles
Songs written by Alex Turner (musician)
Song recordings produced by James Ford (musician)